The women's tournament of basketball at the 2004 Summer Olympics at Athens, Greece began on August 14 and lasted until August 28. The games were held at the Helliniko Olympic Indoor Arena and the Olympic Indoor Hall.

Medalists

Qualifying

Format
 Twelve teams are split into two preliminary round groups of six teams each.
 The top four teams from both groups qualify for the knockout stage.
 Fifth-placed teams from both groups compete for 9th place in an additional match.
 Sixth-placed teams from both groups compete for 11th place in an additional match.
 In the quarterfinals, the matchups are as follows: A1 vs. B4, A2 vs. B3, A3 vs. B2 and A4 vs. B1.
 From the eliminated teams at the quarterfinals, the loser from A1 vs. B4 competes against the loser from B1 vs. A4 for 7th place in an additional match. The remaining two loser teams compete for 9th place in an additional match.
 The winning teams from the quarterfinals meet in the semifinals as follows: A1/B4 vs. A3/B2 and A2/B3 vs. A4/B1.
 The winning teams from the semifinals contest the gold medal. The losing teams contest the bronze.

Tie-breaking criteria:
 Head to head results
 Goal average (not the goal difference) between the tied teams
 Goal average of the tied teams for all teams in its group

Squads

Preliminary round

Group A 

All times are local (UTC+3)

Group B

All times are local (UTC+3)

Classification games

11th place game

9th place game

7th place game

5th place game

Knockout stage

Quarterfinals

Semifinals

Bronze medal game

Gold medal game

Statistical leaders
Top ten in points, rebounds and assists, and top 5 in steals and blocks.

Points

Rebounds

Assists

Steals

Blocks

Game highs

Final standings

See also
 Men's Tournament

References
2004 Olympics: Tournament for Women, FIBA Archive. Accessed March 11, 2011.
Official Olympic Report, la84foundation.org. Accessed March 11, 2011.

 
2004
Women's basketball
International women's basketball competitions hosted by Greece
2004 in women's basketball
Women's events at the 2004 Summer Olympics